The Ecomuseum Zoo is a Canadian ecomuseum of zoological park in Sainte-Anne-de-Bellevue, Quebec and was founded in 1988. It is accredited by the Canadian Association of Zoos and Aquariums (CAZA). It occupies  of land on the western tip of the Island of Montreal.

The Ecomuseum is home to 115 different species of animal native to the Saint Lawrence Valley in southwestern Quebec. The Ecomuseum is operated by the Saint-Lawrence Valley Natural History Society and opened in 1988.

History

Dr. John Roger Bider founded the St. Lawrence Valley Natural History Society in 1981 to help educate children about the environment.

The first education programs on the site were offered in 1989. The first building on the site, for administration and education, was opened in 1992. Ecomuseum opened in the winter for the first time in 1996.

Gallery

References

External links

Zoos in Quebec
Tourist attractions in Montreal
Museums established in 1988
1988 establishments in Quebec
Non-profit organizations based in Quebec
Ecomuseums
Sainte-Anne-de-Bellevue, Quebec
Zoos established in 1988